Myrmeleon immaculatus is a species of pit-trapping antlion in the family Myrmeleontidae. It is found in Central America and North America and is a particularly common species in the eastern United States.This species is usually a blue-grey color and the adults are 30mm long.

References

Further reading

 

Myrmeleontidae
Articles created by Qbugbot
Insects described in 1773
Taxa named by Charles De Geer